Monte Vista Hotel was a hotel in Sunland, California that existed from 1887 to 1964.

Monte Vista Hotel or Hotel Monte Vista may refer to:

 Hotel Monte Vista, in Flagstaff, Arizona
 Monte Vista Hotel (Black Mountain, North Carolina)

See also
 Monte Vista (disambiguation)